This is a list of forest research institutes around the world, by continent and country. It includes research institutions with a primary focus on forest science, forestry, forest management, and related fields.

International
 Center for International Forestry Research (CIFOR), Bogor, Indonesia
 Center for Tropical Forest Science, Panama City, Panama
 European Forest Institute, Joensuu, Finland
 International Union of Forest Research Organizations (IUFRO) Vienna, Austria

Africa

Algeria 
 Institut national de recherche forestière (INRF)

Ethiopia 
 Ethiopian Environment and Forest Research Institute

Ghana 
 Forestry Research Institute of Ghana

Kenya 
 Kenya Forestry Research Institute

Malawi 
 Forestry Research Institute of Malawi

Nigeria 
 Forestry Research Institute of Nigeria

South Africa
 Council for Scientific and Industrial Research
 Institute for Commercial Forestry Research
 Forestry and Agricultural Biotechnology Institute (FABI), University of Pretoria
 Forestry and Forest Products Research Center, Durban, "a joint venture between CSIR's Natural Resources and the Environment operating unit and the University of KwaZulu-Natal"
 Merensky

Uganda 
 Institute of Tropical Forest Conservation

Americas

Canada 

 Atlantic Forestry Centre
 Canadian Wood Fibre Centre
 Centre for Forest Biology, Victoria, British Columbia
 Great Lakes Forestry Centre, Sault Ste. Marie, Ontario
 Laurentian Forestry Centre
 Northern Forestry Centre
 Ontario Forest Research Institute
 Pacific Forestry Centre
 FPInnovations

Chile 
 Instituto Forestal, Ministry of Agriculture
 Instituto de Bosques y Sociedad, Austral University of Chile

Puerto Rico 
 International Institute of Tropical Forestry

Suriname 
 Centre for Agricultural Research in Suriname

United States
 Forest Products Laboratory
 Institute for Resource Information Systems
 Institute of Forest Resources, University of Washington, Seattle, Washington (created by Washington State Legislature, 1947)
 International Institute of Tropical Forestry
 Northern Research Station
 Oregon Forest Resources Institute
 Pacific Northwest Research Station
 Pacific Southwest Research Station
 Rocky Mountain Research Station
 Southern Research Station
 USDA Forest Service, Research and Development Branch

Asia

Nepal 
 Forest Research and Training Centre (formerly Department of Forest Research and Survey)

Bangladesh 
 Bangladesh Forest Research Institute (formerly Forest Products Research Laboratory)

India

 Advanced Research Centre for Bamboo and Rattan, Aizawl
 Arid Forest Research Institute, Jodhpur
 Centre for Forest Based Livelihood and Extension, Agarlata
 Centre for Forestry Research and Human Resource Development, Chhindwara
 Centre for Social Forestry and Eco-Rehabilitation, Prayagraj
 Forest College and Research Institute, Tamil Nadu Agricultural University, Mettupalayam
 Forest Research Institute, Dehradun
 Forest Research Institute, Kanpur, Uttar Pradesh Forest Department
 Gujarat Forest Research Institute
 Himalayan Forest Research Institute, Shimla
 Institute of Forest Biodiversity, Hyderabad
 Institute of Forest Genetics and Tree Breeding, Coimbatore
 Institute of Forest Productivity, Ranchi
 Institute of Wood Science and Technology, Bengaluru
 Kerala Forest Research Institute, Peechi, Thrissur
 Rain Forest Research Institute, Jorhat
 Tropical Forest Research Institute, Jabalpur
 Van Vigyan Kendra (Forest Science Centres)
 State Forest Research Institute, Chennai

Japan 
 Yamanashi Forest Research Institute

Korea 
 National Institute of Forest Science
 Tree-Ring Research Center, Chungbuk National University

Lao P.D.R. 
 National Agriculture and Forestry Research Institute

Malaysia 
 Forest Research Institute Malaysia
 Malaysia Palm Oil Board

Myanmar (Burma) 
 Forest Research Institute, affiliated with the University of Forestry (Yezin)

Pakistan 
 Pakistan Forest Institute, Peshawar

Taiwan 
 Taiwan Forestry Research Institute

Tajikistan 
 Tajik State Forest Research Institute, Dushanbe, affiliated with the Forestry Agency under the Government of Tajikistan

Thailand
 Forest Restoration Research Unit, Chiang Mai

Vietnam 
 Forestry Science Institute of Vietnam

Europe

Austria 
 Federal Forest Research Centre Vienna

Belgium 
 Research Institute for Nature and Forest

Finland 
 Finnish Forest Research Institute (Metla)

Germany 

 Bayerische Landesanstalt für Wald und Forstwirtschaft
 Forschungsanstalt für Waldökologie und Forstwirtschaft Rheinland-Pfalz
 Forstliche Versuchs- und Forschungsanstalt Baden-Württemberg
 Landesbetrieb Wald und Holz NRW - Lehr- und Versuchsforstamt Arnsberger Wald
 Landesforst Mecklenburg-Vorpommern - Forstliches Versuchswesen
 Landeskompetenzzentrum Forst Eberswalde (Brandenburg)
 Nordwestdeutsche Forstliche Versuchsanstalt (Niedersachsen, Hessen, Sachsen-Anhalt, Schleswig-Holstein)
 Sachsenforst - Kompetenzzentrum Wald und Forstwirtschaft
 Thünen-Institut - Institut für Waldökosysteme
 Thüringenforst - Forstliches Forschungs- und Kompetenzzentrum Gotha

Hungary 
 Hungarian Forest Research Institute

Latvia 
 Latvian State Forest Research Institute "Silava"

Norway 
 Norwegian Forest Research Institute
 Norwegian Institute of Bioeconomy Research

Russia 
 Forestry Engineering Academy, Saint Petersburg
 Saint Petersburg Forestry Research Institute, since 1929, Saint Petersburg
 Sukachev Institute of Forest, Russian Academy of Sciences, Moscow

Belarus 
 Forest Research Instite, National Academy of Sciences of Belarus, Homel

Spain 
 Forest Sciences Centre of Catalonia (CTFC)
 Forest Research Centre (INIA-CIFOR)

Sweden 
 Forestry Research Institute of Sweden (Skogforsk)

Switzerland 
 Swiss Federal Institute for Forest, Snow and Landscape Research (WSL)

United Kingdom 
 Forest Research (agency), Forestry Commission
 Aberystwyth Research Unit
 Alice Holt Research Station
 Northern Research Station

Oceania

Australia 
 Commonwealth Scientific and Industrial Research Organisation (CSIRO)

New Zealand 
 Scion (Crown Research Institute)

See also 
 List of environmental research institutes
 List of forestry universities and colleges
 Food and Agriculture Organization (FAO), Rome
 International Forestry Resources and Institutions (IFRI) network, Michigan, US
 International Union of Forest Research Organizations (IUFRO), Vienna
 World Agroforestry Centre, Nairobi, Kenya
 World Forestry Congress

References

External links
 
 FAO Forest Research Institutions Database (2006)

 
Research institutes
Research institutes
 Research institutes
Forest